The Moftin oil field is an oil field located in Moftin, Satu Mare County. It was discovered in 2012 and developed by Rompetrol. It will begin production in 2014 and will produce oil.

References

Oil fields in Romania